Eduardo Jiménez may refer to:
 Eduardo Jiménez de Aréchaga, Uruguayan jurist
 Eduardo Jiménez (baseball), Venezuelan baseball pitcher
 Eduardo Jiménez (volleyball), Mexican volleyball player
 Eduardo Jiménez (sport shooter), Spanish sports shooter